Olszynka is one of the quarters of the city of Gdańsk, Poland.

External links
 Map of Olszynka

Districts of Gdańsk